Mohamed El Baghdadi (born January 1, 1995) is an Egyptian professional footballer who plays as a centre-forward for the Egyptian club Al Nasr. He began his career in youth level in Al Ahly. He was a part of Aswan SC from August 2015 to August 2017. He joined Al Nasr in September 2017.

References

1995 births
Living people
Egyptian footballers
Association football forwards
Aswan SC players
Al Nasr SC (Egypt) players